Colm Bairéad (born 1981) is an Irish film director and screenwriter. He wrote and directed the film The Quiet Girl (2022).

Career

Born in Dublin in 1981, Bairéad grew up speaking English and Irish at home.

The Quiet Girl (Irish: An Cailín Ciúin), Bairéad's first feature film, premiered at the 72nd Berlinale in 2022 and has received critical acclaim. He adapted the film's mostly Irish-language screenplay from the 2010 short story "Foster" by Claire Keegan. At the 18th Irish Film & Television Awards, The Quiet Girl won Best Film and Bairéad won Best Director, and it was nominated for Best International Feature Film at the 95th Academy Awards in the US.

Personal life
Bairéad is married to Cleona Ní Chrualaoí, who produced The Quiet Girl. They have two children.

Partial filmography

As director

References

External links

1981 births
Living people
Irish film directors
Irish male screenwriters